Harry Eugene Simon (July 13, 1873 – June 8, 1932) was an American sport shooter who competed in the 1908 Summer Olympics.

In 1908 he won a silver medal in 300 metre free rifle event and took 19th place in the individual free rifle competition, scoring 86 points out of a possible 100 at the distance of 1000 yards. In 1912 he won the world championship cup at Bayonne Biarritz, France.

He was born in Jersey City, New Jersey and died in Lakeside, Ohio.

References

External links
profile

1873 births
1932 deaths
American male sport shooters
Shooters at the 1908 Summer Olympics
Olympic silver medalists for the United States in shooting
Medalists at the 1908 Summer Olympics